John William Edgington (5 April 1936 – February 1993) was a British racewalker. He competed in the men's 20 kilometres walk at the 1964 Summer Olympics.

References

1936 births
1993 deaths
Athletes (track and field) at the 1964 Summer Olympics
British male racewalkers
Olympic athletes of Great Britain
Place of birth missing